Caizi may refer to:

Caizi Jiaren, a genre of pre-modern Chinese fiction
Caizi, Gansu, a town in Longxi County, Gansu, China
Caizi Township, Puge County, Sichuan, China